Jermain "Choo Choo" Mackey (born 27 December 1979) is a Bahamian professional boxer of the 2000s and 2010s who won the Bahamas super middleweight title, World Boxing Council (WBC) Caribbean Boxing Federation (CABOFE) super middleweight title, World Boxing Association (WBA) Fedecaribe super middleweight title, Commonwealth super middleweight title, and was a challenger for the World Boxing Organization (WBO) North American Boxing Organization (NABO) super middleweight title against Jean Pascal, WBC International super middleweight title against Adonis Stevenson, and World Boxing Association Fedelatin super middleweight title against Kirt Sinnette, his professional fighting weight varied from welterweight to light heavyweight. He represented the Bahamas at the 2002 Commonwealth Games.

References

External links

1979 births
Bahamian male boxers
Sportspeople from Nassau, Bahamas
Light-heavyweight boxers
Living people
Middleweight boxers
Super-middleweight boxers
Commonwealth Games competitors for the Bahamas
Boxers at the 2002 Commonwealth Games